Amy Williams (born 1993) is a Welsh international indoor bowler.

Bowls career
In 2022, she won the Welsh National indoor title, which qualified her to represent Wales at the 2022 World Bowls Indoor Championships. Williams is also a two times winner of the under-25 title at the IIBC Championships.

References

Welsh female bowls players
1993 births
Living people